Franz Ritter von Epp (born Franz Epp; from 1918 as Ritter von Epp; 16 October 1868 – 31 January 1947) was a German general and politician who started his military career in the Bavarian Army. Successful wartime military service earned him a knighthood in 1916.

Biography

Military career
Franz Epp was born in Munich in 1868, the son of the painter Rudolph Epp and Katharina Streibel. He spent his school years in Augsburg and after this joined the military academy in Munich. He served as a volunteer in East Asia during the Boxer Rebellion in 1900–01 and then became a company commander in the colony of German South-West Africa (now Namibia), where he took part in the bloody Herero and Namaqua Genocide. During the First World War, he served as the commanding officer of the Royal Bavarian Infantry Lifeguards Regiment in France, Serbia, Romania, and at the Isonzo front.

For his war service, Epp received numerous medals, of which the Pour le Mérite (29 May 1918) was the most significant. He was also knighted, being made Ritter von Epp on 25 February 1918, and received the Bavarian Military Order of Max Joseph (23 June 1916).

Freikorps
After the end of the war, Epp formed the Freikorps Epp, a right-wing paramilitary unit mostly made up of war veterans, of which the future leader of the SA Ernst Röhm was a member. This unit took part in the crushing of the Bavarian Soviet Republic in Munich, being responsible for various massacres. Epp joined the Reichswehr and was promoted to Generalmajor in 1922. He took his leave from the German Army after getting involved with right-wing associations in 1923.

When it became necessary for the Nazi Party to purchase a newspaper to publicize its political creed, Epp made available some 60,000 Reichsmarks from secret army funds to acquire the Völkischer Beobachter, which became the daily mouthpiece of the party.

As the Sturmabteilung (SA) expanded, it became an armed band of several hundred thousand men, whose function was to guard Nazi rallies and disrupt those of other political parties. Some of its leaders, particularly Ernst Röhm, visualized the SA as supplanting the regular army when Adolf Hitler came to national power. To this end, a department was set up under Epp called the Wehrpolitisches Amt (Army political office). Nothing came of this, as a distrustful Hitler had the SA crushed and many of its leaders killed in the Night of the Long Knives in the summer of 1934.

Career in parliament and the Nazi Party
After leaving the Bavarian People's Party, Epp on 20 May 1928 was elected from electoral constituency 26 (Franconia) as one of the first 12 Nazi Party deputies to the Reichstag. He would continue to be elected to the Reichstag in each subsequent election throughout the Weimar and Nazi regimes to 1945. He served as the Nazi Party's head of its Military-Political Office from 1928 to 1945, and later as leader of the German Colonial Society, an organization devoted to regaining Germany's lost colonies. On 31 August 1933 he was made a Reichsleiter, the second highest political rank in the Nazi Party. On 3 October 1933, he was also made a member of the Academy for German Law. In May 1934 he became head of the NSDAP Office of Colonial Policy until its dissolution in February 1943.

Reichskommissar and Reichsstatthalter of Bavaria
Epp's final notable historical action occurred on 9 March 1933, two weeks before the Reichstag passed the enabling act, which granted Hitler dictatorial powers. On the orders of Hitler and Wilhelm Frick, he abolished the Government of Bavaria and set up a Nazi regime, with himself as Reichskommissar. On 10 April Hitler appointed him Reichsstatthalter for Bavaria. In this position he often clashed with Bavaria's Nazi Minister-President Ludwig Siebert. Epp's attempt to limit the influence of the central government on Bavarian politics failed. He, however, retained his post as Reichsstatthalter until the end of the war, although by then he was politically insignificant.

On 8 May 1933, von Epp's DO X crashed at the Passau Kachlet. The city named one of its streets Ritter-von-Epp-Straße.

Arrest and death
He was arrested on Paul Giesler's orders in 1945, for being associated with the Freiheitsaktion Bayern, an anti-Nazi group led by Rupprecht Gerngroß. However, Epp had not wanted to be directly involved with the group, as he considered their goal—surrender to the Allies—a form of backstabbing of the German Army.

Suffering from a heart condition, he was hospitalised at Bad Nauheim at the end of the war. On 9 May 1945, a clerk at the hospital alerted agents from the US Counterintelligence Corps that Epp was a patient there, and he was arrested and sent to a prison camp in Munich to await trial at Nuremberg. He died in detention on 31 January 1947.

Decorations and awards
 Order of the Red Eagle, 4th class (German Empire)
 Order of the Crown, 4th class with swords (Prussia)
 Military Merit Order, 3rd and 4th class with Swords (Bavaria)
 1914 Iron Cross 2nd Class, 1914
 1914 Iron Cross 1st Class, 1915
 Knights Cross of the Military Order of Max Joseph (Kingdom of Bavaria), 1917
 Pour le Mérite, 1918 
 Knight of the Princely House Order of Hohenzollern with swords (Hohenzollern-Sigmaringen)
 Knight 2nd class of the House and Merit Order of Peter Frederick Louis (Oldenburg)
 Knight of the Order of Saint John (Bailiwick of Brandenburg)
Honour Chevron for the Old Guard, February 1934
Honour Cross of the World War 1914/1918, 1934
Golden Party Badge
Sudetenland Medal, 1938
Anschluss Medal, 1939
War Merit Cross 2nd Class and 1st Class with Swords
Knights Cross of the War Merit Cross with Swords, 1943 
 Military Merit Cross, 2nd class (Grand Duchy of Mecklenburg-Schwerin)
 Nazi Party Long Service Award (10 and 15 years)
 Order of the Iron Crown, 3rd class (Austria)
 On 18 May 1933, the city of Passau decided to make von Epp a Citizen of Honor.

Notes

See also
Herero and Namaqua Genocide
Reichskolonialbund
Colonial Political Office of the NSDAP
Research Materials: Max Planck Society Archive

Notes

References

Sources
Biography of Franz Ritter von Epp 
Franz Ritter von Epp– Record of his military career

Further reading
Ein Leben für Deutschland (A life for Germany), Autobiography by Franz Ritter von Epp, Munich, 1939.

External links

 

1868 births
1947 deaths
Bavarian generals
Bavarian People's Party politicians
Bavarian Soviet Republic
Burials at Munich Waldfriedhof
Generals of Infantry (Wehrmacht)
German Army personnel of World War I
German knights
German people who died in prison custody
Knights of the Military Order of Max Joseph
Lieutenant generals of the Reichswehr
Members of the Academy for German Law
Members of the Reichstag of the Weimar Republic
Members of the Reichstag of Nazi Germany
German hunters
Military personnel from Munich
Nazi Party officials
Nazi Party politicians
Nobility in the Nazi Party
People from the Kingdom of Bavaria
Recipients of the Pour le Mérite (military class)
Recipients of the Iron Cross (1914), 1st class
Recipients of the Knights Cross of the War Merit Cross
Reichsleiters
Schutztruppe personnel
20th-century Freikorps personnel
Prisoners who died in United States military detention
Nazis who died in prison custody
German military personnel of the Boxer Rebellion